Sorghum bicolor, commonly called sorghum and also known as great millet, broomcorn, guinea corn, durra, imphee, jowar, or milo, is a grass species cultivated for its grain, which is used for food for humans, animal feed, and ethanol production. Sorghum originated in Africa, and is now cultivated widely in tropical and subtropical regions. S. bicolor is typically an annual, but some cultivars are perennial. Sweet sorghums are sorghum cultivars that are primarily grown for forage, syrup production, and ethanol; they are taller than those grown for grain.

Sorghum bicolor is the cultivated species of sorghum; its wild relatives make up the botanical genus Sorghum.

History

The first archaeological remnants of sorghum are at Nabta Playa on the Upper Nile, c. 8000 BC. However, these are wild sorghum, with small grains and a brittle rachis. Sorghum is believed to have been domesticated from the wild Sorghum arundinaceum in perhaps 7000–5000 BC in the Niger River valley. Botanists divide it into five "races":
durra, developed in India
guinea, a West African variety requiring high rainfall
caudatum, grown by Nilo-Saharan peoples between Lake Chad and Ethiopia
kafir, a drought-resistant type grown in Southern Africa
bicolor, the most common grain

Sorghum grain cannot be consumed unless the indigestible husk is removed. During the transatlantic slave trade, "the only way to remove the husk was by hand, with mortar and pestle." In the United States enslaved women did most of the work in preparing the sorghum and were tasked with cleaning the grain and turning it into flour. Sorghum in the United States was first recorded by Ben Franklin in 1757. 

Some varieties of sorghum were important to the sugar trade. In 1857 James F.C. Hyde wrote, "Few subjects are of greater importance to us, as a people, than the producing of sugar; for no country in the world consumes so much as the United  States, in proportion to its population." The price of sugar was rising because of decreased production in the British West Indies and more demand for confectionery and fruit preserves, and the United States was actively searching for a sugar plant that could be produced in northern states. The "Chinese sugar-cane" as it was called was viewed as a plant that would be productive and high-yielding in that region. 

Richard Pankhurst reports (citing Augustus B. Wylde) that in 19th-century Ethiopia, durra was "often the first crop sown on newly cultivated land", explaining that this cereal did not require the thorough ploughing other crops did, and its roots not only decomposed into a good fertilizer, but they also helped to break up the soil while not exhausting the subsoil.

In 19th-century European accounts, many would use the term "millet" to refer to both pearl millet and sorghum. Milho, in Portuguese references was used to refer to both maize and sorghum, and researchers suspect this is because their vegetative cycle is so similar. Although, when sorghum matures it produces a tassel of exposed grains, which differs from maize which produces a husk. In European accounts, it is hard to tell if they are referring to maize, millet, or sorghum. All of these crops were grown in Africa and sold on slave ships.

Cultivation 

The leading producers of S. bicolor in 2022 were Nigeria (12%), USA (10%), Sudan (8%), and Mexico (8%). It is also successfully cultivated in Europe: The most important producer in terms of cultivated area is France, followed by Italy, Spain and some south-eastern European countries with cultivation areas of several thousand hectares. Sorghum grows in a wide range of temperatures, high altitudes, and toxic soils, and can recover growth after some drought. It can grow on a wide range of soils, such as heavy clay to sandy soils with the pH tolerance ranging from 5.0 to 8.5. It requires an arable field that has been left fallow for at least two years or where crop rotation with legumes has taken place in the previous year. Diversified 2- or 4-year crop rotation can improve sorghum yield, additionally making it more resilient to inconsistent growth conditions. In terms of nutrient requirements, sorghum is comparable to other cereal grain crops with nitrogen, phosphorus, and potassium required for growth. It has five features that make it one of the most drought-resistant crops: 
 It has a very large root-to-leaf surface area ratio.
 In times of drought, it rolls its leaves to lessen water loss by transpiration.
 If drought continues, it  goes into dormancy rather than dying.
 Its leaves are protected by a waxy cuticle.
 It uses C4 carbon fixation thus using only a third of the amount of water that C3 plants require.

Nutritional values

S. bicolor is rich in minerals like phosphorus, potassium and zinc. The nutritional values of S. bicolor are comparable to those of rice, corn and wheat. The energy value of 100 g S. bicolor grains ranges from 296.1 to 356.0 kcal. The grains contain 60 – 75% carbohydrates, 8 – 13% protein and 4 – 6 % fat. The saccharose and glucose content in the stalk is 10 – 16%. In comparison sugar cane has a sugar content of 10 - 20%. Thus S. Bicolor can be used as an alternative to sugar cane. The low starch digestibility of sorghum is caused by the association between the starch granules with the proteins and tannins. The digestibility of the proteins is lower than those of wheat and corn. In contrast to the prolamins of wheat, rye and barley, the kafirins of sorghum do not provoke allergic reactions or autoimmune response in humans. Furthermore, the properties of sorghum inhibit the expression of toxic peptides related to gliadin, making S. bicolor a safe grain for consumption by people with celiac disease.
Jowar is the finest substitute for wheat and rice when it comes to nutrition because it has high levels of thiamine, niacin, riboflavin, and folate.

Cultivation difficulties 

The successful regulation of weeds is a big challenge in the cultivation of sorghum due to its slow juvenile growth. Control can be executed mechanically but needs to be done with caution as sorghum has a fine and shallow root system.

Pests and parasites

Insect damage is a big threat. Over 150 species have been reported to damage Sorghum at different stages of development. This threat generates a significant biomass loss. Sorghum is a host of the parasitic plant Striga hermonthica. This parasite is a devastating pest on the crop. The European corn borer (Ostrinia nubilalis) was introduced to North America by transport of infested sorghum broom corn. 

The following pest species are reported for sorghum crops in northern Mali.

Atherigona soccata (sorghum shoot fly, a major pest): The larvae cut the growing point of the sorghum leaf.
Agonoscelis pubescens is also reported as a sorghum pest.
Busseola fusca (maize stem-borer; Lepidoptera, Noctuidae) attacks maize and sorghum, and occurs especially at higher altitudes. It is a common pest in East Africa, but has also spread to West Africa.
Chilo partellus (spotted stem-borer; Lepidoptera, Crambidae): introduced, from East Africa but spreading. The larvae attack sorghum and maize. Present at low and mid altitudes.
Contarinia sorghicola (sorghum midge or cecidomyie du sorgho in French; Diptera, Cecidomyiidae): The adult resembles mosquitoes. Larvae feed on developing ovaries of sorghum grains.
Melanaphis sacchari (sugar cane aphid) attacks sorghum.

Sitophilus zeamais (maize weevil) and Sitotroga cerealella (Angoumois grain moth) attack stored sorghum and maize.

Sorghum produces chitinases as defensive compounds against fungal diseases. Transgenesis of additional chitinases increases this crop's disease resistance.

Harvest and processing

Harvest is done mostly by hand in developing countries. The panicle containing the grains are cut from the stalk when appropriate moisture content of 16-20 % is reached. Seed maturity can be recognized by the appearance of a black spot at the connection between seed and plant. 

Threshing can then be done either manually or mechanically. Before storing the seeds, they need to reach a moisture content of only 10%, as higher moisture content contributes to the growth of mould as well as to the germination of the seeds.

Uses

Sorghum is cultivated in many parts of the world today. The grain finds use as human food, and for making liquor, animal feed, or bio-based ethanol. Sorghum grain is gluten free, high in resistant starch, and more abundant and diverse phenolic compounds compared to other major cereal crops

Culinary use

In many parts of Asia and Africa, sorghum grain is used to make flat breads that form the staple food of many cultures. Popped grains are a popular snack in parts of Western India.

In India, where it is commonly called jwaarie, jowar, jola, or jondhalaa, sorghum is one of the staple sources of nutrition in Rajasthan, Punjab, Haryana, Uttar Pradesh, and the Deccan plateau states of Maharashtra, Karnataka, and Telangana. An Indian bread called bhakri, jowar roti, or jolada rotti is prepared from this grain.

In Tunisia, where it is commonly called droô, a traditional porridge dish is prepared with ground sorghum powder, milk, and sugar. The dish is a staple breakfast meal consumed in winter months.

In Central America, tortillas are sometimes made using sorghum. Although corn is the preferred grain for making tortillas, sorghum is widely used and is well accepted in Honduras. White sorghum is preferred for making tortillas.

Sweet sorghum syrup is known as molasses in some parts of the United States, although it is not true molasses.

In Southern African countries, sorghum, along with milk, sugar and butter, is used to make Maltabella, a variation of millet porridge.

Alcoholic beverage
In China, sorghum is known as gaoliang (高粱), and is fermented and distilled to produce one form of clear spirits known as baijiu (白酒) of which the most famous is Maotai (or Moutai). 
In Taiwan, on the island called Kinmen, plain sorghum is made into sorghum liquor. In several countries in Africa, including Zimbabwe, Burundi, Mali, Burkina Faso, Ghana, and Nigeria, sorghum of both the red and white varieties is used to make traditional opaque beer. Red sorghum imparts a pinkish-brown colour to the beer.

Bio-based ethanol
In Australia, South America, and the United States, sorghum grain is used primarily for livestock feed and in a growing number of ethanol plants.
In some countries, sweet sorghum stalks are used for producing biofuel by squeezing the juice and then fermenting it into ethanol. Texas A&M University in the United States is currently running trials to find the best varieties for ethanol production from sorghum leaves and stalks in the USA.

Agricultural

It is used in feed and pasturage for livestock. Its use is limited, however, because the starch and protein in sorghum is more difficult for animals to digest than the starches and protein in corn. One study on cattle showed that steam-flaked sorghum was preferable to dry-rolled sorghum because it improved daily weight gain. In hogs, sorghum has been shown to be a more efficient feed choice than corn when both grains were processed in the same way.

The introduction of improved varieties, along with improved management practices, has helped to increase sorghum productivity. In India, productivity increases are thought to have freed up six million hectares of land. ICRISAT (The International Crops Research Institute for the Semi-Arid Tropics) in collaboration with partners produces improved varieties of crops including sorghum. Some 194 improved cultivars of sorghum from the institute have been released.

Sorghum as an alternative to maize/corn
Sorghum can be grown as an alternative to maize (corn). For example, in a crop rotation, maize can be replaced by sorghum. Sorghum has 96% of the nutritional value of maize. In addition, it has more protein than maize. However, it is important to note that protein concentrations can vary and therefore need to be checked at harvest. Furthermore, sorghum is less digestible than maize because of its profile of amino acids. It also contains some bitter substances which can make it not very palatable. Despite these disadvantages, Sorghum is a suitable solution for warmer regions where water is limited. Another advantage is that Sorghum has comparable yield to corn.

Other uses
It is also used for making a traditional corn broom. The reclaimed stalks of the sorghum plant are used to make a decorative millwork material marketed as Kirei board.

As a weed
Weedy races of S. bicolor sensu lato, especially Sorghum × drummondii, are known as shattercane.

Research
Research has been conducted to develop a genetic cross that will make the plant more tolerant to colder temperatures and to unravel the drought tolerance mechanisms, since it is native to tropical climates.  

In the United States, this is important because the cost of corn was steadily increasing due to its use in ethanol production for addition to gasoline.

Sorghum silage can be used as a replacement of corn silage in the diet for dairy cattle. More research has found that sorghum has higher nutritional value compared to corn when feeding dairy cattle, and the type of processing is also essential in harvesting the grain's maximum nutrition. Feeding steam-flaked sorghum showed an increase in milk production when compared to dry-rolling.

Additional research is being done on sorghum as a potential food source to meet the increasing global food demand. Sorghum is resistant to drought- and heat-related stress. The genetic diversity between subspecies of sorghum makes it more resistant to pests and pathogens than other less diverse food sources. In addition, it is highly efficient in converting solar energy to chemical energy, and also in use of water. All of these characteristics make it a promising candidate to help meet the increasing global food demand. As such, many groups around the world are pursuing research initiatives around sorghum (specifically Sorghum bicolor): Purdue University, HudsonAlpha Institute for Biotechnology, Danforth Plant Science Center, the University of Nebraska,  and the University of Queensland among others. The University of Queensland is involved with pre-breeding activities using crop wild relatives as donors along with popular varieties as recipients to make sorghum more resistant to biotic stresses.

Another research application of sorghum is as a biofuel. Sweet sorghum has a high sugar content in its stalk, which can be turned into ethanol. The biomass can be burned and turned into charcoal, syn-gas, and bio-oil.

Genome
The genome of S. bicolor was sequenced between 2005 and 2007. It is generally considered diploid and contains 20 chromosomes, however, there is evidence to suggest a tetraploid origin for S. bicolor. The genome size is approximately 800 Mbp.

Paterson et al., 2009 provides a genome assembly of 739 megabase. The most commonly used genome database is  maintained by Luo et al., 2016. An expression atlas is available from Shakoor et al., 2014 with 27,577 genes.  no pan-genome is available. For molecular breeding (or other purposes) an SNP array has been created by Bekele et al., 2013, a 3K SNP Infinium from Illumina, Inc.

See also

 3-Deoxyanthocyanidin
 Apigeninidin 
 Commercial sorghum
 List of antioxidants in food

References

External links

 Crop Wild Relatives Inventory: reliable information source on where and what to conserve ex-situ, regarding Sorghum genepool
 

bicolor
Grasses of Africa
Cereals
Crops originating from Africa
Energy crops